Juan Williams Rebolledo (1825 in Curacaví, Melipilla Province – 24 June 1910 in Santiago), was a Chilean rear admiral who was the organizer and commander-in-chief of the Chilean navy in 1879 at the beginning of the War of the Pacific. As a politician, he was elected from Valparaiso to the national Congress in 1867, and in 1873 he was elected as city councillor.

Early life
Williams was the son of John Williams Wilson, an English-Chilean navy officer, and Micaela Rebolledo, born in Chile. From a seafaring family in Bristol, England, his father had immigrated to Chile at the age of 27 to serve in its recently formed navy under the command of Lord Cochrane. He reached the rank of commander.
 
The younger Williams joined the navy in 1844. After rising quite fast through the ranks, in 1855 he was appointed General Commandant of the Arsenals and Maritime Governor of Atacama, then the northernmost province of Chile.

Chincha Islands War years
In 1865 Williams became commandant of the Esmeralda, which he sailed during the Chincha Islands War against Spain. During this war, he became a national hero after he captured the Spanish schooner Covadonga at the Naval Battle of Papudo on 26 November 1865. In the following years he trained all the officers who later took part in the War of the Pacific. He also directed the complete reorganization and modernization of the Chilean navy.

In 1867 Williams was elected a Deputy to the Chilean Congress, representing the port of Valparaíso. Six years later he became a city councillor for the same. In 1874 he was appointed General Commandant of the Navy.

War of the Pacific
In 1879, at the beginning of the War of the Pacific against Peru and Bolivia, Williams was named commander-in-chief of the Chilean navy. The government plan was to attack the Peruvian navy immediately, as it was undergoing repairs in the port of Callao and was thus virtually defenseless. He opposed this course of action, insisting on a blockade of the southern Peruvian ports in order to impede the export of nitrates, then the main source of revenue for the Peruvian government. This gave Peru more time for its war preparations. By the time Williams decided that the blockade was not working fast enough, the Peruvian navy was ready and at sea.

At the end of April 1879, Williams finally decided to attack Callao. He left behind his two oldest and weakest ships, Esmeralda and Covadonga, to blockade the port of Iquique, since they could not keep up with the rest of the fleet. They were put into battle against the Peruvian navy's first division on May 21 during the naval battles of Iquique and Punta Gruesa. Although the Esmeralda was lost, the triumph of the Covadonga brought him praise. Historians have noted that his indecision had caused severe problems and his war plans generally failed.

At the end, his constant political infighting with Rafael Sotomayor, Chilean minister of war, and with General Justo Arteaga, Commander-in-Chief of the Army, caused him to lose important support within the administration. After he failed to capture the Huascar in a naval action, he resigned his position in August 1879, and was replaced by Captain Galvarino Riveros.

Later life
After being appointed to several positions within the navy, in 1890 he was promoted to Commander General. During the rebellion of the Chilean Navy that marked the start of the 1891 Chilean Civil War, he resigned and remained loyal to President José Manuel Balmaceda.

Two years before his death he was promoted by a special act of the Chilean Congress to Rear-Admiral. He died in Santiago on 24 June 1910.

External links
 Chilean Navy website, Juan Williams Rebolledo

1825 births
1910 deaths
People from Melipilla Province
Chilean admirals
Chilean Navy personnel of the Chincha Islands War
Chilean Navy personnel of the War of the Pacific
19th-century Chilean Navy personnel
Chilean people of English descent
People of the Chilean Civil War of 1891
Chilean city councillors
Members of the Chamber of Deputies of Chile